A mammy is a U.S. historical stereotype depicting black women who work in a white family and nurse the family's children. The fictionalized mammy character is often visualized as a fat, dark-skinned woman with a motherly personality. The origin of the mammy figure stereotype is rooted in the history of slavery in the United States, as black slave women were often tasked with domestic and childcare work in white American slaveholding households. The mammy caricature was used to create a narrative of black women being happy within slavery or within a role of servitude.  The mammy stereotype associates black women with domestic roles and it has been argued it, combined with segregation and discrimination, limited job opportunities for black women during the Jim Crow era, approximately 1877 to 1966.

History
The mammy caricature was first seen in the 1830s in antebellum proslavery literature as a way to oppose the description of slavery given by abolitionists. One of the earliest fictionalized versions of the mammy figure is Aunt Chloe in Harriet Beecher Stowe's Uncle Tom's Cabin, first published in 1852.

Some scholars see the mammy figure as rooted in the history of slavery in the United States. Slave African American women were tasked with the duties of domestic workers in white American households. Their duties included preparing meals, cleaning homes, and nursing and rearing their owners' children. Out of these circumstances arose the image of the mammy.

Segregation era and National Mall monument

While originating in the slavery period, the mammy figure rose to prominence during the Reconstruction Era. Some scholars feel that in the Southern United States, the mammy played a role in historical revisionism efforts to reinterpret and legitimize their legacy of chattel slavery and racial oppression. The mammy image became especially prominent in the era of racial segregation, and reproductions of it persisted into the 21st century.

In 1923, the United Daughters of the Confederacy proposed the erection of a mammy statue on the National Mall. The proposed statue would have been dedicated to "The Black Mammy of the South". The bill received a standing ovation in the Senate, where it passed with bipartisan consensus, but died in committee in the House following written protests from thousands of black women.

Historical criticism
The historicity of the mammy figure is questionable. Historical accounts point to the identity of most female domestic servants as teenagers and young adults, not "grandmotherly types" such as the mammy. Melissa Harris-Perry has argued that the mammy was a creation of the imagination of the white supremacy, which reimagined the powerless, coerced slave girls as soothing, comfortable, and consenting women. This contradicts other historically accurate accounts of enslaved women fearing for their lives at the hands of abusive masters. In 1981, Andy Warhol included the mammy in his Myths series, alongside other mythological and folklore characters such as Santa Claus, Mickey Mouse, and Superman.

In Mammy: A Century of Race, Gender, and Southern Memory (2008), Kimberly Wallace-Sanders argued that the mammy's stereotypical attributes point to the source of her inspiration: "a long lasting and troubled marriage of racial and gender essentialism, mythology, and southern nostalgia."

The romanticized mammy image survives in the popular imagination of the modern United States. Psychologist Chanequa Walker-Barnes argues that political correctness has led to the mammy figure being less prevalent in the 21st-century culture, but the mammy archetype still influences the portrayal of African-American women in fiction, as good caretakers, nurturing, selfless, strong, and supportive, the supporting characters to white protagonists. She cites as examples Miranda Bailey, Mercedes Jones, and Ivy Wentz.

Fictional characteristics
The mammy is usually portrayed as an older woman, overweight, and dark skinned. She is an idealized figure of a caregiver: amiable, loyal, maternal, non-threatening, obedient, and submissive. The mammy figure demonstrates deference to white authority. On occasion, the mammy is also depicted as a sassy woman. She is devoted to her owners/employers and her primary goal in life is to care for their needs. In some portrayals, the mammy has a family of her own. But her caregiving duties always come first, leading to the mammy being portrayed as a neglectful parent or grandparent. And while the mammy is devoted to her white family, she often treats her own family poorly. Moreover, she has no black friends.

Melissa Harris-Perry describes the relationship between the mammy and other African Americans in Sister Citizen: Shame, Stereotypes, and Black Women in America (2011) by summarizing that "Mammy was not a protector or defender of black children or communities. She represented a maternal ideal, but not in caring for her own children. Her love, doting, advice, correction, and supervision were reserved exclusively for white women and children."

This stereotype contrasts with the Jezebel stereotype, which depicts younger African-American women as conniving and promiscuous. The mammy is occasionally depicted as a religious woman. More often than not, the mammy is an asexual figure, "devoid of any personal desires that might tempt her to sin". This helps the mammy serve as both a confidante and a moral guide to her young charges, capable of keeping them in line.

Kimberly Wallace-Sanders includes other characteristics of the mammy in Mammy. A Century of Race, Gender, and Southern Memory (2008): A large dark body, a round smiling face, a deeply sonorous and effortlessly soothing voice, a raucous laugh. Her personal attributes include infinite patience, self-deprecating wit, an implicit understanding and acceptance of her own inferiority, and her devotion to whites. The mammy was also large-breasted, desexualized, and potentially hostile towards black men. Many of these characteristics were denied to African-American female slaves but were generally attributed to the mammy.

Clothing
The dress often reflects the status of her owner. The mammy is usually neat and clean and wears attire that is suitable for her domestic duties. Sometimes a mammy considers herself to be dressed up, but that is usually just an addition of a bonnet and a silk velvet mantle, which probably belonged to her owner.

Education
The stereotypical mammy is often illiterate, though intelligent in her own way. However, as intelligent as she is, most of her intelligence is a result of past experiences and conflicts.  In particular, a mammy of an aristocratic family can be identified by her air of refinement.

Living conditions
When the mammy does not stay in the house of her owner or is not busy attending to the needs of the owner's children, she usually lives with her husband and children in a cabin that is distinguished from the cabins of the other enslaved people in either size or structure. Her cabin stands near the owner's house, but at a distance from the cabins of the other enslaved people.

Although her duties are far less tiring and strenuous than those of the other slaves, her hours are often long, leaving little time for her own leisure. Not until the mammy becomes too old for these duties does she enjoy any home life of her own, since she is always preoccupied with the home life of her owner. There is a flexibility about the mammy's duties that distinguishes her from just being an ordinary nurse or a wet nurse, even though there is a possibility that she can perform either of these tasks. In some of the wealthier households, the fictional mammy has assistants who would help her take care of the household's children. These women are often much younger than the mammy herself.

The mammy, unlike other slaves, is usually not up for sale, and the children of the mammy are kept in the same family for as long as possible, retaining the same relationships that the mammy has with the owner. There are oftentimes when a mammy is forced to leave her own children behind in order to care for the owner's children. In many cases mammies choice to even have their own children is taken away because they need to be able to fully provide nutrition to their owner's children, and there is a fear that if they are feeding their own children as well there may not be enough milk for the owner's children.

Roles in plantation households
The fictional role of the mammy in plantation households grows out of the roles of enslaved African-Americans on the plantation. African-American slaves played vital roles in the plantation household. For the mammy, the majority of these duties generally are related to caring for the children of the owner's family, thus relieving the mistress of the house of all the drudgery work that is associated with child care. When the children have grown up and were able to take care of themselves properly, the mammy's main role is to help the mistress with household tasks. As her years of service with the family increase, the mammy's sphere of influence increases as well. She is next to the mistress in authority and has the ability to give orders to everybody in the house.

The mammy is often considered to be part of the slaveholding family as much as its blood members were considered. Although she is considered of a lower status, she is still included in the inner circle. She has often been referred to as a "unique type of foster motherhood". Aside from just tending to the needs of the children, the mammy is also responsible for teaching the proper etiquette to them, such as addressing the elders on the plantation as "aunt" or "uncle", as well as what was best to say on a particular occasion and what was not. The mammy is able to discipline her charges whenever they do something undesirable, and is able to retain their respect towards her, even after the children have grown to adults.

Advertising

The mammy caricature has been used as advertisements for corporations especially within the food industry. In 2020 the brand Aunt Jemima came under criticism for its branding after receiving public criticism about the company using a mammy caricature as its logo. The character of Aunt Jemima was not a real person and was portrayed by several people, beginning with freed slave Nancy Green from 1893 to 1923, followed by others including Anna Robinson (1923–1951), Edith Wilson (1948–1966), and Ethel Ernestine Harper (the 1950s). One of the founders of Aunt Jemima came up with the name and branding after hearing a minstrel song called "Old Aunt Jemima". Subsequently, other companies who profited from using images of black caricatures received criticism as well. Uncle Ben's, Mrs. Butterworth's, and Cream of Wheat are some of the companies that were spotlighted. In 2021, Quaker Oats, the owners of the Aunt Jemima brand, decided to rebrand it as The Pearl Milling Company and changed its logo from the mammy caricature to an image of a traditional milling building.

Aunt Priscilla's Recipes was a food and recipe column published in the Baltimore Sun during the 1930s. Aunt Priscilla was a mammy caricature who was the stereotypical good southern cook who spoke in a broken and exaggerated dialect. The alias of Aunt Priscilla was actually a white woman named Eleanor Purcell. Purcell also released several cookbooks under the alias. Purcell also took up the person of Aunt Ada in a column for The Evening Sun named "Ask Aunt Ada". Black women were often the faces of these food or housekeeping columns because of the stereotypes like the mammy which associated them with servant and domestic roles.

Images such as Aunt Jemima and Aunt Priscilla were mammy caricatures that created a negative and limiting representation as servant roles for white families.

Cinema
In the early 20th century, the mammy character was common in many films. Hattie McDaniel became the first African American to win an Academy Award for Best Supporting Actress with her performance as "Mammy" in Gone with the Wind in 1939. In 1940, shortly after the win, the NAACP scrutinized McDaniel's role, and criticized Hollywood for the lack of diverse Black roles and characters outside of servitude.  McDaniel responded to backlash by saying, "Why should I complain about making $7,000 playing a maid? If I didn't, I'd be making $7 a week actually being one."

Some of the contemporary media portrayals of the mammy caricature have been acted out by black men (Henson, 2013). A contemporary portrayal of the mammy caricature is seen in the film Big Momma's House directed by Raja Gosnell and starring Martin Lawrence. In the movie Martin Lawrence plays an FBI agent, Malcolm Turner, who goes undercover as "Big Momma" Hattie Mae Pierce, who exhibits the stereotypical mannerisms and appearance of a mammy caricature. The character of Big Momma is a plus-size older black matriarch and homemaker with overtly religious beliefs and a nurturing demeanor. Another mammy stereotype that the movie displays is the one of midwifery and domestic work. This originates from the history of older Black women serving as midwives on plantations.

The Help is a movie based on a novel by Kathryn Stockett about Black maids of white families in Jackson Mississippi during the 1960s. The novel and film center around the experience of Black domestic workers, influenced by the writer and director both having Black nannies growing up. The story is good from the perspective of the main character Skeeter, who has also been raised by a Black nanny. During the movie, Skeeter convinces several Black maids to share their stories and grievances, which causes an uproar. The movie came under criticism for several reasons. One being that both the novel and film were written and executed by white people, whose portrayals of Black maids were derived from the limited perspectives of people who did not share the life experiences of the people being depicted. The Association of Black Historians released a statement saying, "The Help distorts, ignores and trivializes the experiences of black domestic workers." When asked about her role in the movie, Viola Davis expressed her concern with playing the role because of the stereotype. However, she argued that the mammy remains a caricature because she is never humanized in the writings or portrayals. Davis' mother and grandmother also worked as maids, so she was familiar with the experience and lives of black women within domestic work. Davis also challenged filmmakers to explore the lives of these women outside of the kitchen and to not limit their identity to that of maids.

Comics
 Rachel, Bobby's Make-Believe, 1919, Gasoline Alley, 1921.
 Opal, Edgar Martin's Boots and Her Buddies

Dolls and ceramics 

Mammy imagery can be found in the form of several objects including dolls, ceramics, cookie jars, salt and pepper shakers, and other household items. The mammy caricature was part of post Civil War propaganda that spread negative and false stereotypes about African Americans. These mammy ceramics and dolls had similar effects as the false representations created by minstrel shows. These figurines often had exaggerated features and tried to falsely portray African Americans as "docile, dumb and animated". Despite their racist meaning, these items have been passed down and seen as memorabilia. Although these mammy dolls and ceramics dehumanize Black people, some of them are still valued and sold for hundreds of dollars.

In Natchez, Mississippi there is a roadside restaurant called Mammy's Cupboard that was founded in 1940. The building is shaped like a mammy caricature along with a head-wrap and long red skirt. Similar to Aunt Jemima, Mammy's Cupboard use the imagery and the stereotype of Black women to promote a business. The restaurant's use of a mammy caricature to portray Black servitude is reminiscent of how it was done in the Old South.
The character Beloved Belindy was designed by Raggedy Ann creator Johnny Gruelle. This character was sold as a doll and featured in books.

Novels
 Beloved Belindy Johnny Gruelle

Television
Televisions did not become common in US household until around the mid to late 1940s, making radio shows popular forms of entertainment for the American family. In 1939, Beulah Brown, debuted as a character on the radio show Homeward Unincorporated. Beulah, as a character, was highly stereotypical and was the quintessential mammy figure auditorily. The character was originally played by white actor Marlin Hurt. The character was well taken to and added to several other radio shows. Over time, the creators and producer of these shows wanted to have an actual Black women as the voice of the character. Hattie McDaniel was given the role on the radio version in 1947, as she was famous for her multiple other award-winning performances portraying the mammy stereotype. The radio show was taken to television in the early 1950s and went on to run for three seasons. The first of season of the show, starred Ethel Waters, who later left the series due to not wanting to portray the mammy stereotype any longer. McDaniel, took over the role for the second season, filming a total of six episodes before becoming ill. McDaniel has been noted to have chosen to play these mammy roles time and time again as they were the only accessible roles for black actress during this time. Moreover, she made more money portraying these characters than she would have as an actual maid. Similar to how she was given the role on the radio, McDaniel was the epitome of what a mammy looked like as well with being big in size, large mouth, and dark skin that contrast from white teeth and big eyes. The role on television was also portrayed by Louise Beavers. Aside from the actress that portrayed her, Beulah, as a character, had all the characteristics of a mammy. She always made sure her "family", more the family works for, is well taken care of. Helping them at any cost and putting their need above hers can be seen in multiple episodes of the show. The NAACP, and other critics, did not like the image of the Black American women the show represented as it supported the mammy stereotype.

Over time, the image of the mammy was given a contemporary makeover. Some of the more contemporary features that the mammy received were that her head rag was removed and she became smaller, as well as lighter in complexion. In addition, her owner was not always white.

Some contemporary television sitcoms which featured mammies include Maude, where the character Florida, played by Esther Rolle, worked as a domestic for a white family. A spin-off titled Good Times was made, where Rolle's character became the center of the series; the show focused on her family, which lived generally happy lives in a low-income housing project. Other television series that featured mammies as characters include That's My Mama, Gimme a Break! and What's Happening!!.

When other contemporary mammies emerged, they usually retained their occupation as domestic workers and exhibited these physical feature changes; however, their emotional qualities remained the same. These contemporary mammies continued to be quick-witted and remained highly opinionated. A new twist in the outlook of the contemporary mammy occurred in the sitcom The Jeffersons, where Florence, a maid played by Marla Gibbs, works for an affluent African-American family.

A Different World was a 1980s sitcom that featured students at a fictional historically black college named Hillman. In an episode titled "Mammy Dearest", the mammy stereotype was discussed. The episode centered on an exhibition planned by the character Whitley Gilbert. In the exhibition, Gilbert included images of a "mammy". The character of Charnele Brown is upset and wants it removed from the exhibition. Gilbert and others argue that they must reclaim the image and separate it from its racist history. Later in the episode Brown reveals a childhood story in which she dressed up a Nubian princess for a costume contest at school. When she won, she was referred to as "Aunt Jemima". The incident was traumatic for her because she felt that was how people saw her.

See also
 Black matriarchy
 Dinah
 Madame Sul-Te-Wan
 Stereotypes of African Americans
 Uncle Tom

References

Inline citations

General references
 
 Bernstein, Robin, Racial Innocence: Performing American Childhood from Slavery to Civil Rights (New York: New York University Press, 2011), 157, 174–176, 180–181.
 Bogle, Donald, Toms, Coons, Mulattoes, Mammies, & Bucks: An Interpretive History of Blacks in American Films (New York: Continuum, 1973/1994), 57.
 Camacho, Roseanne V., "Race, Region, and Gender in a Reassessment of Lillian Smith." Southern Women: Histories and Identities. Columbia: University of Missouri Press, 1992. p. 168.
 Clinton, Catherine, The Plantation Mistress: Woman's World in the Old South (New York: Pantheon Books, 1982), 201–202.
 Jewel, K. Sue, From Mammy to Miss America and Beyond: Cultural Images and the Shaping of US Social Policy, 1993.
 Parkhurst, Jessie W., "The Role of the Black Mammy in the Plantation Household", The Journal of Negro History, Vol. 23, No. 3, July 1938
 Smith, Lillian, Killers of the Dream. New York: W.W. Norton, 1949. p. 123-4.
 Thurber, Cheryl, "The Development of the Mammy Image and Mythology." Southern Women: Histories and Identities, Columbia: University of Missouri Press, 1992. p. 96.
 Turner, Patricia A., Ceramic Uncles & Celluloid Mammies: Black Images and Their Influence on Culture (New York: Anchor Books, 1994), 44.

External links

 Pilgrim, David. "The Mammy Caricature". Jim Crow Museum of Racist Memorabilia. Ferris State University, Michigan.
 Mammy Dearest: African-American House Servants in Birth of the Nation, Gone with the Wind, and Song of the South American Studies at the University of Virginia
 
https://shadesofnoir.org.uk/a-different-world-mammy-dearest/

African-American gender relations
African-American-related controversies
Ageism
Blackface minstrel characters
Stereotypes of African Americans
Stereotypes of black women
Stereotypes of working-class women
Female stock characters
Slang terms for women